Daniel Oscar Dahlstrom  (born 1948) is an American philosopher and John R. Silber Professor of Philosophy at Boston University.

Books
Identity, Authenticity, and Humility. Milwaukee: Marquette University Press, 2017.
The Heidegger Dictionary. New York: Bloomsbury Academics, 2013.
 Philosophical legacies: Essays on the Thought of Kant, Hegel, and their Contemporaries. Washington, D.C.: Catholic University of America Press CUA, 2008.
 Heidegger’s Concept of Truth. Cambridge: Cambridge University Press, 2001.
 Das logische Vorurteil: Untersuchungen zur Wahrheitstheorie des frühen Heidegger. Vienna: Passagen, 1994.

Translations
 Martin Heidegger. Introduction to Phenomenological Research. Bloomington, Indiana: Indiana University Press, 2005.
 (with Klaus Brinkmann). Georg Wilhelm Friedrich Hegel. Encyclopedia of the Philosophical Sciences in Basic Outline, Part I: Science of Logic. New York: Cambridge University Press, 2010.
 (with Corey W. Dyck). Moses Mendelssohn. Morning Hours. Amsterdam: Springer, 2011.
 Edmund Husserl. Ideas I. Indianapolis: Hackett, 2014.

References

21st-century American philosophers
Phenomenologists
Continental philosophers
Kant scholars
Philosophy academics
Heidegger scholars
Living people
1948 births
Catholic University of America faculty
Boston University faculty
Presidents of the Metaphysical Society of America